Westwood, Pennsylvania may refer to:

 Westwood, Cambria County, Pennsylvania, a census-designated place
 Westwood, Chester County, Pennsylvania, a census-designated place
 Westwood (Pittsburgh), a neighborhood